The South American Championships in Athletics is a biennial athletics event organized by CONSUDATLE. The first edition in 1919 was competed between only two countries (Chile and Uruguay), but it has since expanded and has generally been held every two years since 1927. 

In addition, 8 unofficial championships were held between 1918 and 1957: The 1918 event was titled "Campeonato de Iniciación". The 1922 event was titled "Campeonato Latino-Americano". The 1931 event was held in celebration of the 100th anniversary of Uruguayan independence. The 1946 event was held in celebration of the 50th anniversary of the modern Olympic Games. The 1948 event was held in celebration of the 100th anniversary of the foundation of La Paz. The 1950 event was held in celebration of the 30th anniversary of the Uruguayan Athletics Federation. The 1957 event was for men only.

Countries are measured by a points system resulting from their respective athletes' performances. The country with the highest total points is declared the winner.

Summary of Championships

Wins by country

See also
 List of South American Championships in Athletics records

References

External links

Atletismo Sudamericano official website
Past championships results

 
Athletics
Continental athletics championships
Athletics
Biennial athletics competitions